Pentti  Matikainen (born October 5, 1950 in Joensuu, Finland) is a Finnish hockey coach and general manager. He was selected the SM-liiga coach of the year in 1984. As the coach of the Finnish national ice hockey team, he led Finland to silver medals in the 1988 Winter Olympics and the 1992 World Championships, and to third place in the 1991 Canada Cup. Matikainen was the coach of HIFK from 1987 to 1990 and its CEO from 2001 to 2008.

Coaching awards and honours
head coach
 (1): Calgary 1988 (Winter Olympics)
 (1): 1992 IIHF World Championship
 (1): 1991 Canada Cup
 Izvestia Trophy (1): 1989
 SM-liiga (1): 1986–87
 SM-liiga, (5): 1983–84, 1984–85, 1985–86, 1987–88, 1995–96

References 

1950 births
Living people
Jokipojat players
Mikkelin Jukurit players
SaiPa players
Finland men's national ice hockey team coaches
People from Joensuu
Sportspeople from North Karelia